Skelly Field at H. A. Chapman Stadium is an outdoor college football stadium in the south central United States, located on the campus of the University of Tulsa in Tulsa, Oklahoma. Commonly known as H. A. Chapman Stadium, it is the home field for the Tulsa Golden Hurricane of the American Athletic Conference.

The HA Chapman Stadium opened  in 1930 and its current seating capacity is around 30,000 for football, following the renovation of 2008.

History
The 14,500-seat stadium opened in 1930 as Skelly Field, named for its primary benefactor, William Skelly, the founder of Skelly Oil. Tulsa defeated Arkansas 26–6 at the inaugural game on October 4.

In 1947, the north stands were added and the stadium was renamed Skelly Stadium. In 1965, the track was removed, the field was lowered, the west stands were expanded and the south stands were added, bringing the capacity to 40,385 seats. In February 2005, the north stands were demolished to make way for the new Case Athletic Complex, reducing the seating to 35,542. In 2007–2008, the stadium was renovated, reducing capacity to 30,000 

Located on historic U.S. Route 66, the stadium hosted the Oklahoma Outlaws of the United States Football League (USFL) in 1984. Skelly was once the principal home field for two American football legends – future NFL Hall-of-Famer (and later U.S. Congressman) Steve Largent when he played for the University of Tulsa and Doug Williams of the Oklahoma Outlaws, who later was a Super Bowl MVP for the Washington Redskins. The stadium was also home to the Tulsa Roughnecks of the North American Soccer League 1978–1984 and the short-lived Tulsa Mustangs of the AFA.

On April 26, 2007, it was reported that, with a renovation project underway, the stadium was renamed as Skelly Field at H. A. Chapman Stadium after the primary benefactor of the renovation.

The stadium is also used for the Jenks–Union football rivalry games.

Attendance records
The stadium's attendance record was established  in 1987, when 47,350 watched top-ranked Oklahoma shut out Tulsa 65–0 on September 26.

Top Ten Single Game Attendance

Largest season attendance average
The highest attendance average in a season was 31,236 in 1991 with 7 games.

Wins

Tulsa's Victories at Skelly Field

Renovation

The stadium was renovated following the 2007 season. The project included new seating, a new pressbox, club and loge seating, and a new scoreboard. With the removal of the upper section of the west stands, seating capacity dropped to approximately 30,000, which made Chapman Stadium the smallest stadium in Conference USA.

See also
 List of NCAA Division I FBS football stadiums

References

External links
 Skelly Stadium from TulsaHurricane.com
 Stadium Renovation Page

College football venues
Tulsa Golden Hurricane football
s
United States Football League venues
Sports venues in Tulsa, Oklahoma
American football venues in Oklahoma
Sports venues completed in 1930
North American Soccer League (1968–1984) stadiums
1930 establishments in Oklahoma
Soccer venues in Oklahoma